The NAF Neunkirchener Achsenfabrik AG is a medium-sized family-run company in Neunkirchen am Brand, Bavaria, Germany. NAF manufactures axles and transfer cases for self-propelled applications for construction, forestry and agriculture machinery. NAF is the market leader for powered bogie axles (forestry machinery drives).

History
The NAF was founded on 24 March 1960 by the then mayor of Neunkirchen and member of Bavarian state parliament, Georg Hemmerlein, and the entrepreneur Kaspar Lochner from Munich, Germany. In 1968 the production of planetary axles started. In 1970, the research and development office in Munich was opened by Ernst Auer. In 1974 Helmut Weyhausen took over the company. Since 1976, bogie axles are manufactured.

In 2017/2018, a new paint shop and a five-storey office building were added to the existing factory. The newly built painting shop is fully automated, works with the latest generation of painting robots and enables the painting of axles weighing up to 6 tonnes.

In 2021, the ground-breaking ceremony was held for a new test centre, which is scheduled for completion in 2022.

Awards 
 1995 initial certification ISO 9001
 2007 quality seal „Sicher mit System“ ("Systematic Safety") for effective occupational health and safety by employer's liability insurance association
 2009 130. Jobstar of metropolitan region Nuremberg
 2016 initial certification ISO 14001
 2016 initial certification ISO 50001
 2019 initial certification ISO 45001
 2020 BAYERNS BEST 50

Offices 
 2007 NAF Russia GmbH, Ekaterinburg, Russia
 2015 NAF Axles North America Inc., Morris, Illinois, USA

Products
The NAF manufactures heavy duty drive lines for off-road applications worldwide such as:
construction machinery (wheeled loader, wheeled excavator, articulated dump truck, motor grader, compactor, roller)
forestry machinery (forwarder, harvester, skidder, feller buncher)
agriculture machinery (forage harvester, self-propelled cutter-bar, combined harvester, self-propelled sprayer, sugar-beet harvester, pineapple harvester, pea harvester)
other applications (airport equipment, harbor cranes, loader for scrap and recycling yards, mining equipment, heavy haul trucks)

Products are:
axles
planetary bogie axles
portal bogie axles
planetary portal bogie axles
planetary steering axles
planetary rigid axles
transfer cases
transfer cases
transfer cases for two hydraulic motors (DualSync®)
components
differential gears
planetary hubs

External links 
 company website
 report in Chamber of Commerce magazine Nuernberg
 press release "Markt Neunkirchen am Brand"

References

Manufacturing companies of Germany
Companies based in Bavaria
Manufacturing companies established in 1960
1960 establishments in West Germany
German companies established in 1960